The Federal Correctional Institution, Beaumont (FCI Beaumont) is a United States federal prison for male inmates in unincorporated Jefferson County, Texas. It is part of the Beaumont Federal Correctional Complex (FCC Beaumont) and is operated by the Federal Bureau of Prisons, a division of the United States Department of Justice.  It consists of two facilities:

 Federal Correctional Institution, Beaumont Low: a low-security facility
 Federal Correctional Institution, Beaumont Medium: a medium-security facility

FCC Beaumont is located approximately 35 miles from the Gulf of Mexico; 100 miles east of Houston; and 190 miles west of Baton Rouge, Louisiana.

Facility and programs
FCI Beaumont Medium has 12 general population housing units. Educational opportunities include GED and ESL programs, as well as adult continuing education and correspondence classes. Inmates work at an on-site UNICOR textile factory.

Notable inmates

See also
List of U.S. federal prisons
Federal Bureau of Prisons
Incarceration in the United States

References

Buildings of the United States government in Texas
1998 establishments in Texas
Buildings and structures in Beaumont, Texas
Beaumont Low
Prisons in Jefferson County, Texas